Easter in Poland, a public holiday, is one of that country's major holidays, often compared in importance to Christmas. Associated with it are many specific customs and traditions. 

Easter has been celebrated in Poland since the country's Christianization in the Middle Ages. During the period of Poland's partitions, it was also an important patriotic observance, reminding Poles of their culture.

Easter is also important to Polish-Americans and other Polish diasporans.

According to a 2012 survey, about 90% of Poles observe some Easter customs, and over 50% participate in Christian Easter observances.

Traditions 

Some Polish Easter traditions reach back to earlier, pagan beliefs; some are fusions of pagan and adopted, Christian traditions. They include the Polish Easter basket (święconka), prepared on Holy Saturday, and Easter eggs (pisanki). During Easter, work, both occupational and domestic, is kept to a minimum. As Poland is predominantly Catholic, the Easter traditions are largely Catholic, though most religious minorities also observe their own customs associated with Easter. 

A week before Easter, on Palm Sunday, Easter palms are displayed. Often sung during the procession are a number of religious songs relating to Easter. 

At home, people partake in an Easter breakfast, during which they gift and share eggs. The Easter table is decorated with Easter eggs and other symbols, such as a Lamb of God (a small figurine, often sculpted from edible substances such as sugar, bread, or butter), similar small figurines of chickens and rabbits (Easter Bunnies), and springtime flowers or twigs of plants such as buxus. Typical Easter foods include eggs, meats such as kiełbasa (sausage), soups such as żurek and barszcz, and cakes such as mazurek and babka.

The second day of Easter, Easter Monday, features its own customs, such as śmigus-dyngus, involving the spraying of other persons with water. There are also other games, many involving eggs, such as egg tapping.

Polish Easter traditions, some varying regionally, include:

 Burning of Judas
 
 Easter palm
 Easter Bunny
 
 Fat Thursday
 
 Gorzkie żale
 
 Pisanka (Polish Easter egg)
 
 
 
 
 Siwki
 Śmigus-dyngus
 Siuda Baba
 Śmiergust
 Święconka (Polish Easter basket)

See also 
 Christmas in Poland

References